is a former Japanese rugby union player who played as a lock. He spent his whole career playing for NEC Green Rockets in Japan's domestic Top League, playing a single season. He was named in the Japan squad for the 2007 Rugby World Cup, making 1 appearance in the tournament. He made a further 25 appearances for Japan in his career, scoring one try.

References

External links
itsrugby.co.uk profile

1978 births
Living people
Japanese rugby union players
Rugby union locks
Green Rockets Tokatsu players